The bilateral relationship between Taiwan and the United States of America are the subject of the Japan-U.S. relations during Japanese colonial rule and China-U.S.relations before the government of the Republic of China (ROC) led by the Kuomintang (Chinese Nationalist Party) retreated to Taiwan and its neighboring islands as a result of the Chinese Civil War and until the U.S. ceased recognizing the ROC in 1979 as "China" as a result of the One China policy following the Joint Communiqué on the Establishment of Diplomatic Relations under the Carter administration. Prior to relations with the ROC, the United States had diplomatic relations with the Qing dynasty beginning on  until 1912.

After the United States established diplomatic relations with the Beijing government, or People's Republic of China (PRC), under the Communist Party of China's rule as "China" in 1979, Taiwan–United States relations became unofficial and informal. Until , informal relations between the two states were governed by the U.S. Taiwan Relations Act (TRA), which allows the United States to have relations with the "people on Taiwan" and their government, whose name is not specified. U.S.–Taiwan relations were further informally grounded in the "Six Assurances" in response to the third communiqué on the establishment of US–PRC relations.  Following the passage of the Taiwan Travel Act by the U.S. Congress on March 16, 2018, relations between the United States and Taiwan have since maneuvered to an official and high-level basis. Both sides have since signed a consular agreement formalizing their existent consular relations on September 13, 2019. The United States removed self-imposed restrictions on executive branch contacts with Taiwan on January 9, 2021.

The policy of deliberate ambiguity of US foreign policy to Taiwan is important to stabilize cross-strait relations and to assist Taiwan from an invasion by the PRC if possible, whereas a policy of strategic clarity on Taiwan would likely induce PRC opposition and challenges to US legitimacy in East Asia or beyond. As stipulated by the TRA, the United States continues to be the main provider of arms to Taiwan, which is often a source of tension with the PRC. Both states maintain representative offices functioning as de facto embassies.  Taiwan is represented by the Taipei Economic and Cultural Representative Office in the United States (TECRO), and the United States by the American Institute in Taiwan (AIT).

History

Background
In 1784, the United States attempted to send a consul to China, but this was rejected by the Chinese government, with official relations beginning on June 16, 1844, under President John Tyler, leading to the 1845 Treaty of Wangxia.

Two American diplomats in the 1850s suggested to Washington that the U.S. should obtain the island of Taiwan from China, but the idea was rejected.  Aboriginals on Taiwan often attacked and massacred shipwrecked western sailors, and American diplomats tried to help them. In 1867, during the Rover incident, Taiwanese aborigines attacked shipwrecked American sailors, killing the entire crew. They subsequently skirmished against and defeated a retaliatory expedition by the American military and killed another American during the battle.

Prior to the annexation of Hawaii, the Revive China Society, a predecessor to the Kuomintang (KMT) was founded in 1894 in Honolulu in opposition to the Qing.

As Taiwan was under Japanese control, following the Xinhai Revolution in 1911, which overthrew the Qing dynasty, the William Taft administration recognized the government of the Republic of China (ROC) as the sole and legitimate government of China despite a number of governments ruling various parts of China. China was reunified by a single government, led by the Kuomintang (KMT) in 1928, which subsequently gained recognition as China's only legitimate government despite continued internal strife.  The first winner of the Nobel Prize in Literature for writing about China was an American, born in the United States but raised in China, Pearl S. Buck, whose 1938 Nobel lecture was titled The Chinese Novel.

In the Japanese era, the United States also   hosted a consulate in Taihoku, Formosa (today Taipei) from 1913. The consulate was closed in 1941 due to United States declaration of war on Japan. The site is now protected as the Former American Consulate in Taipei.

During the Pacific War, the United States and the Republic of China were allied against Japan. In October 1945, a month after Japan's surrender, representatives of Chiang Kai-shek, on behalf of the Allies, were sent to Formosa to accept the surrender of Japanese troops.  However, during the period of the 1940s, there was no recognition by the United States Government that Taiwan had ever been incorporated into Chinese national territory.  Chiang continued to remain suspicious of America's motives.

WWII-democratization

As the Korean War broke out, the Truman Administration resumed economic and military aid to the ROC on Taiwan and neutralized the Taiwan Strait by United States Seventh Fleet to stop a Communist invasion of Formosa (as well as a potential ROC counter-invasion of the mainland). US military presence in Taiwan consisted of the Military Assistance Advisory Group (MAAG) and the United States Taiwan Defense Command (USTDC). Other notable units included the 327th Air Division. Until the US formally recognized the People's Republic of China in 1979, Washington provided ROC with financial grants based on the Foreign Assistance Act, Mutual Security Act and Act for International Development enacted by the US Congress. A separate Sino-American Mutual Defense Treaty was signed between the two governments of US and ROC in 1954 and lasted until 1979.

The U.S. State Department's official position in 1959 was:

During the early Cold War the United States deployed nuclear weapons on Taiwan as part of the United States Taiwan Defense Command. In 1972, United States president Richard Nixon ordered nuclear weapons to be removed from Taiwan and this was implemented by 1974.

At the height of the Sino-Soviet Split, and at the start of the reform and opening of People's Republic of China, the United States strategically switched diplomatic recognition from the Republic of China (ROC) to the People's Republic of China (PRC) on January 1, 1979, to counter the political influences and military threats from the Soviet Union. The US Embassy in Taipei was 'migrated' to Beijing and the Taiwanese Embassy in the US was closed. Following the termination of diplomatic relations, the United States terminated its Mutual Defense Treaty with Taiwan on January 1, 1980.

On April 10, 1979, U.S. President Jimmy Carter signed into law the Taiwan Relations Act (TRA), which created domestic legal authority for the conduct of unofficial relations with Taiwan. U.S. commercial, cultural, and other interaction with the people on Taiwan is facilitated through the American Institute in Taiwan (AIT), a private nonprofit corporation. The institute has its headquarters in the Washington, DC area and has offices in Taipei and Kaohsiung. It is authorized to issue visas, accept passport applications, and provide assistance to U.S. citizens in Taiwan. A counterpart organization, the Taipei Economic and Cultural Representative Office in the United States (TECRO), has been established by Taiwan. It has its headquarters in Taipei, the representative branch office in Washington, DC, and 11 other Taipei Economic and Cultural Offices (TECO) in the continental U.S. and Guam. The Taiwan Relations Act (TRA) continues to provide the legal basis for the unofficial relationship between the U.S. and Taiwan, and enshrines the U.S. commitment to assisting Taiwan maintain its defensive capability.

After de-recognition, the U.S. still maintains unofficial diplomatic relations with Taiwan through Taipei Economic and Cultural Representative Office; the current head of TECRO in Washington, D.C. is Stanley Kao. The American Institute in Taiwan, a non-profit institute headquarters in the US soil under the laws of the District of Columbia in Arlington County, Virginia and serves as the semi-official, working-level US representation and AIT has branch offices in Taipei and Kaohsiung. The Chairman of AIT is Raymond Burghardt. Christopher J. Marut was appointed to be the new AIT Taipei Office Director in August 2012. With the absence of diplomatic recognition, in the present state, Taiwan-US relations are formally guided by the service of enactment of Taiwan Relations Act by US Congress for the continuation of Taiwan-US relations after 1979.

Taiwan helped Ronald Reagan circumvent the Boland Amendment by providing covert support to the Contras in Nicaragua.

Reagan pressured Taiwan into giving up its Sky Horse ballistic missile program.

Taiwan's secret nuclear weapons program was revealed after the 1987 Lieyu massacre, when Colonel Chang Hsien-yi Deputy Director of Nuclear Research at INER, who was secretly working for the CIA, defected to the U.S. in December 1987 and produced a cache of incriminating documents. The CIA oversaw negotiations with the Taiwanese which led them to abandon their nuclear ambitions in return for security guarantees. Since the end of the nuclear weapons program the “Nuclear Card” has played an important part in Taiwan's relationship with the United States.

Post-democratization 
In 1997 the Speaker of the United States House of Representatives, Newt Gingrich, traveled to Taiwan and met with President Lee Teng-hui.

In 1999 former President Jimmy Carter visited Taiwan. 

In July 2002, Minister of Justice Chen Ding-nan (陳定南) became the first Taiwanese government official to be invited into the White House since 1979.

The Taiwan Policy Act of 2013 was raised and passed in the House Committee on Foreign Affairs by the US Congress to update the conditions of US-Taiwan relations. In 2015 Kin Moy was appointed to the Director of the AIT.

U.S. commercial ties with Taiwan have been maintained and have expanded since 1979. Taiwan continues to enjoy Export-Import Bank financing, Overseas Private Investment Corporation guarantees, normal trade relations (NTR) status, and ready access to U.S. markets. In recent years, AIT commercial dealings with Taiwan have focused on expanding market access for American goods and services. AIT has been engaged in a series of trade discussions, which have focused on copyright concerns and market access for U.S. goods and services.

On December 16, 2015, the Obama administration announced a deal to sell $1.83 billion worth of arms to the Armed Forces of Taiwan, a year and eight months after U.S. House passed the Taiwan Relations Act Affirmation and Naval Vessel Transfer Act of 2014 to allow the sale of Oliver Hazard Perry-class frigates to Taiwan. The deal would include the sale of two decommissioned U.S. Navy frigates, anti-tank missiles, Assault Amphibious Vehicles, and FIM-92 Stinger surface-to-air missiles, amid the territorial disputes in the South China Sea. China's foreign ministry had expressed its disapproval for the sales and issued the U.S. a "stern warning", saying it would hurt China–U.S. relations.

A new $250 million compound for the American Institute in Taiwan was unveiled in June 2018, accompanied by a "low-key" American delegation. The Chinese authorities estimated this action as violation of "one China" policy statement and claimed the US to stop any relations with Taiwan.

In September 2018, the United States approved the sale of $330 million worth of spare parts and other equipment to sustain the Republic of China Air Force.

In July 2019, the US State Department approved the sale of M1A2T Abrams tanks, Stinger missiles and related equipment at an approximate value of $2.2 billion to Taiwan.

In May 2020, the US State Department approved a possible Foreign Military Sale of 18 MK-48 Mod 6 Advanced Technology Heavy Weight Torpedoes for Taiwan in a deal estimated to cost $180 million.

On 9 August 2020, U.S. Health and Human Services Secretary Alex Azar visited Taiwan to meet President Tsai Ing-wen, the first visit by an American official since the break in diplomatic relations between Washington and Taipei in 1979. In September 2020, U.S. Under Secretary of State for Economic Growth, Energy, and the Environment Keith J. Krach attended the memorial service for former Taiwanese President Lee Teng-hui.

In September 2020, the US Ambassador to the United Nations Kelly Craft met with James K.J. Lee, director-general of the Taipei Economic and Cultural Office in New York, who was secretary-general in Taiwan's Ministry of Foreign Affairs until July, for lunch in New York City in what was the first meeting between a top Taiwan official and a United States ambassador to the United Nations. Craft said she and Lee discussed ways the US can help Taiwan become more engaged within the U.N., and she pointed to a December 2019 email alert from Taiwan that WHO had ignored, recognizing and warning about the danger of the person-to-person transmission of the new highly contagious Covid-19 virus in China.

In an October 2020 deal of $2.37 billion between the U.S and Taiwan, the U.S. State Department approved the potential sale to Taiwan of 400 Harpoon anti-ship cruise missiles including associated radars, road-mobile launchers, and technical support.

In January 2021, Taiwan President Tsai Ing-wen met with United States Ambassador to the UN Kelly Craft by video link. Craft said: "We discussed the many ways Taiwan is a model for the world, as demonstrated by its success in fighting COVID-19 and all that Taiwan has to offer in the fields of health, technology and cutting-edge science.... the U.S. stands with Taiwan and always will." Speaking in Beijing,  Chinese Ministry of Foreign Affairs spokesman Zhao Lijian said: "Certain U.S. politicians will pay a heavy price for their wrong words and deeds." On her last day in office later that month, Craft called Taiwan "a force for good on the global stage -- a vibrant democracy, a generous humanitarian actor, a responsible actor in the global health community, and a vigorous promoter and defender of human rights."

In June 2021 a congressional delegation made up of Tammy Duckworth, Dan Sullivan (U.S. senator) and Christopher Coons briefly visited Taiwan and met with President Tsai Ing-wen. Their use of a C-17 military cargo aircraft drew strong protest from China.

On March 3, 2021, the Biden Administration reasserted the strength of the relationship between the U.S. and Taiwan in the administration's Interim National Security Strategic Guidance. On March 8, 2021, the Biden Administration made the following statement during a press briefing: "We will stand with friends and allies to advance our shared prosperity, security, and values in the Indo-Pacific region.  We maintain our longstanding commitments, as outlined in the Three Communiqués, the Taiwan Relations Act, and the Six Assurances.  And we will continue to assist Taiwan in maintaining a sufficient self-defense capability."

On May 23, 2022, President Biden, during his trip to Asia, vowed to defend Taiwan with US military in the case of an invasion by China. At the end of May Illinois Senator Tammy Duckworth led a congressional delegation to Taiwan.

In late May 2022, the State Department restored a line on its fact sheet on US-Taiwan relations which it removed earlier in the month and stated it did not support Taiwanese independence. However, another line which was also removed in the earlier fact sheet that acknowledged China’s sovereignty claims over Taiwan was not restored while a line that stated the U.S would maintain its capacity to resist any efforts by China to undermine the security, sovereignty and prosperity of Taiwan in a manner that was consistent with the Taiwan Relations Act was added to the updated fact sheet.

In July 2022 Senator Rick Scott led a congressional delegation to Taiwan.

On August 2, 2022, Nancy Pelosi, the Speaker of the United States House of Representatives led a congressional delegation to Taiwan, leading to a military and economic response from China. Later in August a congressional delegation led by Massachusetts Senator Ed Markey also visited Taiwan and Indiana Governor Eric Holcomb (who became the first Indiana Governor to visit Taiwan since 2005). At the end of August Tennessee Senator Marsha Blackburn visited Taiwan. At the end of August and beginning of September Arizona Governor Doug Ducey visited Taiwan.

In February 2023 Representatives Ro Khanna, Jake Auchincloss, Jonathan Jackson and Tony Gonzales visited Taiwan.

Notable events
In 1949, when Generalissimo Chiang Kai-shek's troops decamped to Taiwan at the end of the Chinese civil war, Washington continued to recognize Chiang's "Republic of China" as the government of all China. In late 1978, Washington announced that it would break relations with the government in Taipei and formally recognize the People's Republic of China (PRC) as the "sole legal government of China."

Washington's "one China" policy, however, does not mean that the United States recognizes, nor agrees with Beijing's claims to sovereignty over Taiwan. On July 14, 1982, the Republican Reagan Administration gave specific assurances to Taiwan that the United States did not accept China's claim to sovereignty over the island (Six Assurances), and the U.S. Department of State informed the Senate that "[t]he United States takes no position on the question of Taiwan's sovereignty."

The U.S. Department of State, in its U.S. Relations With Taiwan fact sheet, states "[T]he United States and Taiwan enjoy a robust unofficial relationship. The 1979 U.S.–P.R.C. Joint Communiqué switched diplomatic recognition from Taipei to Beijing. In the Joint Communiqué, the United States recognized the Government of the People's Republic of China as the sole legal government of China, acknowledging the Chinese position that there is but one China and Taiwan is part of China.

The United States position on Taiwan is reflected in "the six assurances to Taiwan", the Three Communiqués, and the Taiwan Relations Act (TRA).
The Six Assurances include:
1. The United States has not agreed to set a date for ending arms sales to Taiwan;
2. The United States has not agreed to hold prior consultations with the Chinese on arms sales to Taiwan;
3. The United States would not play any mediation role between Taiwan and Beijing;
4. The United States has not agreed to revise the Taiwan Relations Act;
5. The United States has not altered its position regarding sovereignty over Taiwan; and
6. The United States would not exert pressure on Taiwan to enter into negotiations with the Chinese. The "Three Communiqués" include The Shanghai Communiqué, The Normalisation Communiqué, and The August 17 Communiqué, which pledged to abrogate official US-ROC relations, remove US troops from Taiwan and gradually end the arms sale to Taiwan, but with the latter of no timeline to do so, an effort made by James Lilley, the Director of American Institute in Taiwan.

President Bush was asked on 25 April 2001, "if Taiwan were attacked by China, do we (The U.S.) have an obligation to defend the Taiwanese?" He responded, "Yes, we do...and the Chinese must understand that. The United States would do whatever it took to help Taiwan defend herself." He made it understood that "though we (China and the U.S.) have common interests, the Chinese must understand that there will be some areas where we disagree." On the advice of his advisors, Bush later made clear to the press that there was no change in American policy.

On 19 June 2013, ROC Ministry of Foreign Affairs expressed gratitude for a US Congress's bill in support of Taiwan's bid to participate in the International Civil Aviation Organization (ICAO). On July 12, 2013, US President Barack Obama signed into law H.R. 1151, codifying the US government's full support for Taiwan's participation in the ICAO as a non-sovereign entity. The United States has continued the sale of appropriate defensive military equipment to Taiwan in accordance with the Taiwan Relations Act, which provides for such sales and which declares that peace and stability in the area are in U.S. interests. Sales of defensive military equipment are also consistent with the 1982 U.S.-P.R.C. Joint Communiqué.

Maintaining diplomatic relations with the PRC has been recognized to be in the long-term interest of the United States by seven consecutive administrations; however, maintaining strong, unofficial relations with Taiwan is also a major U.S. goal, in line with its desire to further peace and stability in Asia. In keeping with its China policy, the U.S. does not support de jure Taiwan independence, but it does support Taiwan's membership in appropriate international organizations, such as the World Trade Organization, Asia-Pacific Economic Cooperation (APEC) forum, and the Asian Development Bank, where statehood is not a requirement for membership. In addition, the U.S. supports appropriate opportunities for Taiwan's voice to be heard in organizations where its membership is not possible.

On 24 August 2010, the United States State Department announced a change to commercial sales of military equipment in place of the previous foreign military sales in the hope of avoiding political implications. However pressure from the PRC has continued and it seems unlikely that Taiwan will be provided with advanced submarines or jet fighters.

Taiwan has indicated that it is willing to host national missile defense radars to be tied into the American system, but is unwilling to pay for any further cost overruns in the systems.

On December 2, 2016, U.S. President-Elect Donald Trump accepted a congratulatory call from Taiwanese President Tsai Ing-Wen, which was the first time since 1979 that a President-Elect has publicly spoken to a leader of Taiwan. Donald Trump stated the call was regarding "the close economic, political and security ties between Taiwan and the US".  The phone call had been arranged by Bob Dole, who acted as a foreign agent on behalf of Taiwan.

On 16 March 2018, President Trump signed the Taiwan Travel Act, allowing high-level diplomatic engagement between Taiwanese and American officials, and encourages visits between government officials of the United States and Taiwan at all levels. The legislation has sparked outrage from the PRC, and has been applauded by Taiwan.

On 17 July 2018, Taiwan's Army officially commissioned all of its Apache attack helicopters purchased from the United States, at cost of $59.31 billion NT(US$1.94 billion), having completed the necessary pilot training and verification of the fleet's combat capability. One of the helicopters was destroyed in a crash during a training flight in Taoyuan in April 2014 and the other 29 have been allocated to the command's 601st Brigade, which is based in Longtan, Taoyuan. Taiwanese President Tsai Ing-wen said the commissioning of the Apaches was "an important milestone" in meeting the island's "multiple deterrence" strategy to counter an invasion and to resist Beijing's pressure with support from Washington, which has been concerned about Beijing's growing military expansion in the South China Sea and beyond.

On 26 March 2020, President Trump signed the TAIPEI Act, aiming to increase the scope of US relations with Taiwan and encouraging other nations and international organizations to strengthen their official and unofficial ties with the island nation.

In late October 2021, U.S. Secretary of State Antony Blinken called on all United Nations member states to support Taiwan's participation in the U.N. system. The comments came a day after the 50th anniversary of U.N. Resolution 2758, in which the People's Republic of China was designated as the representative of China at the U.N., while the Republic of China (R.O.C.) was expelled.

In December 2021, the U.S. invited Taiwan to the Summit for Democracy.

On December 15, 2021, the US House of Representative and Senate have both passed the National Defense Authorization Act for Fiscal Year 2022, in which calls for the enhancements of the security of Taiwan, including inviting the Taiwanese navy to the 2022 Rim of the Pacific exercise in the face of "increasingly coercive and aggressive behavior" by China. President Joe Biden later signed the act on Dec 27th.

On 27 January 2022, U.S. Vice President Kamala Harris and Vice President of Taiwan Lai Ching-te had a brief conversation during the presidential inauguration ceremony of Xiomara Castro of Honduras.

Consular representation
The United States operates a de facto embassy in Taipei called the American Institute in Taiwan. It also operates a de facto consulate in Kaohsiung called the American Institute in Taiwan Kaohsiung Branch Office.

Taiwan operates several diplomatic missions in the United States, with the Taipei Economic and Cultural Representative Office in the United States located in Washington, D.C. This mission is also accredited to Cuba, the Bahamas, Grenada, Antigua and Barbuda, Dominica, and Trinidad and Tobago, despite Taiwan not having official relations with them. Other than the mission in Washington, Taiwan also operates representative offices in Atlanta, Boston, Chicago, Honolulu, Houston, Miami, Los Angeles, New York, San Francisco, Seattle, Guam, and Denver.

See also
 China–United States relations
 Foreign relations of Taiwan
 Foreign relations of the United States
 List of US arms sales to Taiwan
 Military Assistance Advisory Group
 Political status of Taiwan
 Twin Oaks (Washington, D.C.)
 United States beef imports in Taiwan
 United States Taiwan Defense Command

References

Further reading

 Benson, Brett V., and Emerson MS Niou. "Public opinion, foreign policy, and the security balance in the Taiwan Strait." Security Studies 14.2 (2005): 274–289.
 Bush, Richard C. At cross purposes: US-Taiwan relations since 1942 (Routledge, 2015).
 Carpenter, Ted Galen. America's coming war with China: a collision course over Taiwan (Macmillan, 2015).
 Glaser, Charles L. "A US-China grand bargain? The hard choice between military competition and accommodation." International Security 39#4 (2015): 49–90.
 Hickey, Dennis Van Vranken. "America's Two-point Policy and the Future of Taiwan." Asian Survey (1988): 881–896. in JSTOR
 Hickey, Dennis V. "Parallel Progress: US-Taiwan Relations During an Era of Cross-Strait Rapprochement." Journal of Chinese Political Science 20#4 (2015): 369–384.
 Hu, Shaohua. "A Framework for Analysis of National Interest: United States Policy toward Taiwan," Contemporary Security Policy, Vol. 37, No. 1 (April 2016): 144–167.
 Kim, Claudia J. (2019) "Military alliances as a stabilising force: U.S. relations with South Korea and Taiwan, 1950s-1960s." Journal of Strategic Studies
 Liao, Nien-chung Chang, and Dalton Kuen-da Lin. "Rebalancing Taiwan–US Relations." Survival 57#6 (2015): 145–158. online
 Ling, Lily HM, Ching-Chane Hwang, and Boyu Chen. "Subaltern straits:‘exit’,‘voice’, and ‘loyalty’in the United States–China–Taiwan relations." International Relations of the Asia-Pacific (2009): lcp013.
 Matray, James I. ed. East Asia and the United States: An Encyclopedia of relations since 1784 (2 vol. Greenwood, 2002). excerpt v 2
 Peraino, Kevin. A Force So Swift: Mao, Truman, and the Birth of Modern China, 1949 (2017), focus on .S. policy in 1949
 Sutter, Robert. "US Domestic Debate Over Policy Toward Mainland China and Taiwan: Key Findings, Outlook and Lessons." American Journal of Chinese Studies (2001): 133–144.

External links
Taiwan-US Relations  from the Dean Peter Krogh Foreign Affairs Digital Archives 
Mandatory Guidance from Department of State Regarding Contact with Taiwan
U.S. Relations With Taiwan
Taiwan - US Relations from the Dean Peter Krogh Foreign Affairs Digital Archives
Stating America's Case to China's Hu Jintao: A Primer on U.S.-China-Taiwan Policy

 
United States
Bilateral relations of the United States